Walter Richard (born 13 October 1939) is a former Swiss cyclist. He competed in the team pursuit at the 1968 Summer Olympics.

References

External links
 

1939 births
Living people
Swiss male cyclists
Olympic cyclists of Switzerland
Cyclists at the 1968 Summer Olympics
Cyclists from Zürich